Len and the River Mob was a ten-part Look and Read serial produced by the BBC in 1968, it was written by Roy Brown.

Story

Len Tanner has moved to London with his friend Pat and her mother, Mrs Green; he gets a job at the docks working for Mr Moon, which involves lifting boxes, crates and sacks from the tugs on the river and moving them into Moon's shed.  He decides that he wants to buy Pat a doll with his pay, so he goes to the local toy shop only to find that it has been robbed.

Pat's Uncle Bill, a police officer, tells him that the thieves have stolen everything.  Len heads back to the docks and begins moving boxes again. Inside of one of them he discovers various toys including dolls.  His workmates, Micky and Dave, tell him to put them away before Mr Moon comes back.  Later, Len asks Bill if he knows who stole the toys and he replies that there is a gang called "The River Mob" who are operating around the docks and that they are the prime suspects.  Bill hands Len a police note that says that a crate, marked "996/HO", containing an engine, was stolen the week before and tells him to keep an eye out for it.

The next day, Mr Moon tells the workers that he has a big job to do and that they should just get on with the carrying work.  As soon as Mr Moon leaves, Micky and Dave begin to fool around.  Len finds a note which Mr Moon has accidentally left behind which talks of "picking up a crate for samba".  Len suspects this might be the stolen crate and when Mr Moon returns they all help with a crate from a boat.  Len checks its marking, "OH/966", against that of the number Bill gave him, dismissing it as a different box before he and Micky are told to put it in the shed.  After work Len and Pat take a walk round the docks and spot a boat coming in named the S.S. Samba.  They talk to Roy, a sailor from the ship, who tells them that it is not a happy ship. The ship's Captain, Grenko, comes out and Roy heads back to the boat.  Len and Pat head home but on their way pass Mr Moon's shed, which is open, and hide inside to see what is going on.

They see Captain Grenko and Mr Moon talking about boats.  When Pat goes home, Len decides to check the crates again but almost gets caught by Bill, who finds Len's knife.  The next morning Bill confronts him about it but he refuses to talk in front of his workmates.  Micky sees the police officer talking to Len and tells Mr Moon that he thinks Len is a spy, proving to Len that they are indeed the gang.  They tell him that they'll have to keep an eye on him from now on, before going to get the crate.  Len spots that it says "This way up" and realises that he'd read the marking upside-down and it was the stolen crate.  He tries to run away to tell Bill but gets caught by the gang, who tie him up and leave him in the shed.  He shouts for help but nobody can hear over the noise of the docks.  Out of the shed window he sees Bill and his dog, Flash, coming down the street.  He sees a bit of paper on the floor and realises it is the police note.  He struggles and marks the letters on the note with his knife so that it says "I am in shed Len".  He wraps it round his knife and pushes it out of the shed.  The dog comes and picks it up but when Bill reads it he cannot see Len and says that he shouldn't have left the note lying around.

Meanwhile, on the boat, Roy complains that they shouldn't have left Len.  Mr Moon refuses to speak to him and tells him to get Micky to send a radio message to Captain Grenko.  Instead of doing that, Roy sends a message to the police informing them of Len's capture and that the crate is on its way to Gravesend.  When Bill sees the message he rushes to the shed and frees Len, who tells them that they must find crate before it reaches the Samba.  They race in a police car to Gravesend, where they head for the wharf.  A police boat waits for them and Len quickly spots Mr Moon's boat.  As they chase after it, the boat goes out of control and it becomes clear that Roy has taken the wheel.  Eventually the police catch and overpower the gang, arresting them and recovering the stolen engine.

Episodes
A Job in the Docks
The Dutch Doll
The Missing Crate
The Big Job
Captain Grenko
Is Len a Thief?
This Way Up
Tied and Gagged
Find The S.S. Samba
After Them!

Cast
Angela Crow as Mrs Green (and introducer for part 8)
Arthur Gross as the Police Inspector
Christopher Chittell as Micky
Denise Powell as Pat
George Layton as Len Tanner (and introducer except part 8)
Harvey Hall - Narrator
Kenneth Colley as Mr Moon
Kenneth Gardnier as Roy
Leonard Kingston as Captain Grenko
Paul Sarony as Dave
Philip Brack as Bill

Crew
Story - Roy Brown
Script - Leonard Kingston
Producer - Andrée Molyneux

See also
Look and Read
Bob and Carol Look for Treasure: The Lost Treasure
Dark Towers
Geordie Racer
Through The Dragon's Eye
Earth Warp

External links

Look and Read